Hardshell is an unincorporated community in Breathitt County, Kentucky, United States.

History
Hardshell was named for the Hardshell Baptist church located within the community. A post office was established at Hardshell in 1917, and remained in operation until it was discontinued in 1959.

References

Unincorporated communities in Breathitt County, Kentucky
Unincorporated communities in Kentucky